Chicoreus paini is a species of sea snail, a marine gastropod mollusk in the family Muricidae, the murex snails or rock snails.

Distribution
This marine species occurs off the Solomon Islands

References

External links
 Houart R. (1983). Three new tropical muricacean species (Gastropoda: Muricidae). Venus. 42(1): 26-33

Gastropods described in 1983
Chicoreus